Mike Tyson: The Knockout is an American two-part television documentary series about the life of boxing legend Mike Tyson which premiered on May 25, 2021, on ABC.

Episodes

References

External links

2020s American documentary television series
2020s American television miniseries
2021 American television series debuts
2021 American television series endings
American biographical series
American Broadcasting Company original programming
Documentary television series about sports
English-language television shows
Historical television series
Cultural depictions of Mike Tyson